This list is of the Historic Sites of Japan located within the Prefecture of Kumamoto.

National Historic Sites
As of 17 June 2022, forty-six Sites have been designated as being of national significance (including one *Special Historic Site); Miike coal mine spans the prefectural borders with Fukuoka.

Prefectural Historic Sites
As of 1 August 2021, eighty Sites have been designated as being of prefectural importance.

Municipal Historic Sites
As of 1 May 2021, a further five hundred and fifty-three Sites have been designated as being of municipal importance.

See also

 Cultural Properties of Japan
 Kumamoto Prefectural Ancient Burial Mound Museum
 List of Places of Scenic Beauty of Japan (Kumamoto)
 List of Cultural Properties of Japan - paintings (Kumamoto)
 List of Cultural Properties of Japan - historical materials (Kumamoto)
 List of Cultural Properties of Japan - archaeological materials (Kumamoto)

External links
  Cultural Properties in Kumamoto Prefecture

References

Kumamoto Prefecture
 Kumamoto